Mount Pittard is a pointed mountain (2,410 m) standing 12 nautical miles (22 km) east of the north part of Homerun Range in the Admiralty Mountains. Mapped by United States Geological Survey (USGS) from surveys and U.S. Navy aerial photography, 1960–63. Named by Advisory Committee on Antarctic Names (US-ACAN) for Donald A. Pittard, United States Antarctic Research Program (USARP) biologist at McMurdo Station, 1966–67 and 1967–68.

Mountains of Victoria Land
Pennell Coast